Bodegraven-Reeuwijk is a municipality in the western Netherlands, in the province of South Holland with a population of  in . It was established by a merger of Bodegraven and Reeuwijk on 1 January 2011.

Population centres  
The new merger also includes the historic municipalities of Waarder, Middelburg, Oukoop, Sluipwijk, Wiltenburg, Vrijhoef en Kalverbroek, parts of Zwammerdam, Lange Ruige Weide, Hekendorp, Land van Stein, Rietveld and Barwoutswaarder, as well as the communities of Driebruggen, Hogebrug, Langeweide, Meije, Nieuwerbrug, Oud-Reeuwijk, Platteweg, Randenburg, Reeuwijk-Brug, Reeuwijk-Dorp, Tempel, Oud-Bodegraven (Vrijenes), Weijpoort and Reeuwijk-Westeinde.

Topography

Dutch Topographic map of the municipality of Bodegraven-Reeuwijk, June 2015.

Paedophilia rumours 

In 2020, false allegations were circulated online, that in the 1980s the town had been the site of the sexual abuse and murder of a number of children. In 2022, this led the town's authorities to take legal action to have the allegations removed from Twitter. The council lost the case.

Notable people 

 Pieter Verhoek (1633 in Bodegraven – 1702) a Dutch Golden Age poet and painter. 
 Dominicus van Tol (ca.1635 in Bodegraven – 1676) a Dutch Golden Age painter
 Gijsbert Verhoek (1644 in Bodegraven – 1690) a Dutch Golden Age painter. 
 Johan Zoutman  (1724 in Reeuwijk – 1793) a Dutch naval figure and Rear Admiral
 Jan Ceton (1875 in Bodegraven – 1943) a Dutch left-wing politician
 Maarten de Niet Gerritzoon (1904 in Bodegraven – 1979) a Dutch politician
 Jacob Korevaar (born 1923 in Lange Ruige Weide) a Dutch mathematician and academic
 Arnold Merkies (born 1968 in Bodegraven) a Dutch politician

Sport 
 Jaap Beije (1927 in Bodegraven – 2013) a Dutch rower, competed at the 1952 Summer Olympics
 Ria van Velsen (born 1939 in Bodegraven) a retired Dutch artistic gymnast who participated in the 1960 Summer Olympics
 Marjorie van de Bunt (born 1968 in Reeuwijk) a Dutch Paralympian athlete competing in Biathlon and Cross-country skiing

Gallery

References

External links
  Official website

 
Municipalities of South Holland
Municipalities of the Netherlands established in 2011